The Sunda Shelf mangroves ecoregion, in the mangrove biome, are on the coasts of the islands of Borneo and eastern Sumatra in Malaysia and Indonesia. They are home to the proboscis monkey.

As well as being an important habitat for terrestrial and marine wildlife, mangroves preserve the shape of the coastline.

Flora
There are more plant species here than in most mangrove forests in the world, with five different types of mangrove dominating parts of the region as follows: Avicennia and Sonneratia species on the coast where water is saltiest and the tidal wash strongest; Rhizophoras and Bruguieras in the swampy areas just behind them; and Nypa fruticans palms in the freshwater streams further inland still.

About 28 species of mangroves trees grow in the ecoregion, including Aegiceras corniculatum, Avicennia alba, Avicennia lanata, Avicennia marina, Avicennia officinalis, Bruguiera cylindrica, Bruguiera gymnorhiza, Bruguiera parviflora, Bruguiera sexangula, Ceriops decandra, Ceriops tagal, Excoecaria agallocha, Heritiera littoralis, Kandelia candel, Lumnitzera littorea, Lumnitzera racemosa, Nypa fruticans, Phoenix paludosa, Rhizophora apiculata, Rhizophora lamarckii, Rhizophora mucronata, Rhizophora stylosa, Scyphiphora hydrophyllacea, Sonneratia alba, Sonneratia caseolaris, Sonneratia ovata, Xylocarpus granatum, and Xylocarpus moluccensis.

Fauna
Mammals of the mangroves include the proboscis monkey (Nasalis larvatus), which is endemic to the Bornean mangroves and adjacent lowlands, and is absent from Sumatra.

The mangroves are home to many birds, including the white-bellied sea eagle (Haliaeetus leucogaster) and brahminy kite (Haliastur indus), and species of herons, cormorants, plovers, sandpipers, kingfishers, terns, sunbirds, munias, and tailor birds.

Threats and preservation
Mangroves are vulnerable ecosystems as trees are cut for timber, firewood and to clear land for agriculture and urban development such as shrimp farming. This loss of habitat persists despite the mangroves being part of a large number of protected areas including: on Borneo Bako National Park in Malaysia and Tanjung Puting and Gunung Palung National Parks in Indonesia, and on Sumatra Berbak and Sembilang National Parks.

Protected areas include:
 Bako National Park
 Batumapun Forest Reserve
 Berbak National Park
 Binsuluk Forest Reserve
 Bukau Api-Api Forest Reserve
 Bukit Soeharto Grand Forest Park
 Gunung Palung National Park
 Gunung Pueh National Park
 Kabili Sepilok Forest Reserve
 Klias Forest Reserve
 Kota Kinabalu Wetlands Nature Reserve
 Kuala Lupak Wildlife Reserve
 Kuching Wetlands National Park
 Kulamba Forest Reserve
 Kutai National Park
 Lower Kinabatangan-Segama Wetlands
 Malawaring Forest Reserve	
 Maludam National Park
 Menumbok Forest Reserve
 Miri-Sibuti Coral Reef National Park
 Muara Kaman Sedulang Nature Reserve
 Nunukan Nature Reserve 
 Pulau Siarau Nature Reserve
 Rajang Mangrove National Park
 Samunsam Widlife Reserve
 Santubong National Park
 Sebangau National Park
 Sembilang National Park
 Sepilok (Mangrove) Forest Reserve
 Sibuti Wildlife Reserve
 Similajau National Park
 Sungai Bulan dan Sungai Lulan Nature Reserve
 Sungai Gologob Forest Reserve
 Sungai Kapur Forest Reserve
 Sungai Lasun & Pulau Evans Forest Reserve
 Sungai Maruap Forest Reserve
 Sungai Segama Forest Reserve
 Sungai Serudong Forest Reserve
 Tabin Wildlife Reserve
 Tanjung Datu National Park
 Tanjung Puting National Park
 Tawau Forest Reserve
 Teak Plantation Forest Reserve
 Teluk Adang Nature Reserve
 Teluk Apar Nature Reserve
 Teluk Kelumpang, Selat Laut dan Selat Sebuku Nature Reserve
 Teluk Pamukan Nature Reserve
 Trusan Kinabatangan Forest Reserve
 Tun Mustapha Park
 Ulu Sebuyau National Park
 Umas Umas Forest Reserve
 Weston Forest Reserve

References

 
Central Indo-Pacific
Ecoregions of Asia
Ecoregions of Brunei
Ecoregions of Indonesia
Ecoregions of Malaysia

Forests of Indonesia
Forests of Malaysia
Indomalayan ecoregions
Mangrove ecoregions
Natural history of Brunei